L. Jean Camp (born in Charlotte, North Carolina) is a professor at the Indiana University School of Informatics and Computing. She was previously an associate professor at the John F. Kennedy School of Government, before which she was at Sandia National Laboratories. She is best known for her work which combines computer security and the social sciences. In particular her work on Economics of security dates from 2001.  She was an original participant in the Workshops on Economics of Information Security.

Camp is a graduate of the Engineering and Public Policy Program from Carnegie Mellon, where she completed her doctoral research on Internet Commerce. She has over one hundred forty additional works. These are focused primarily on security, privacy and trust; although there is early work on the opposition to censoring women's health information. Her work in opposing censorship arose from her activism with Donna Riley for free information while they were students at Carnegie Mellon during the CyberPorn Scare.

In 2016, Camp was a part of a small computer group which was involved in analysis of various DNS logs, making a relation between Trump Organization and Alfa Bank. She has published the details of her finding at her website, including a graph which shows the timeline of the connections made between the two parties. She also advocated against the subpoena filed by Alfa Bank requiring to identify the security researchers, who initially found the logs. In November 2020, the Indiana Court quashed the subpoena filed by Alfa Bank resulting in the identites of the researchers being kept a secret.

Her research on open code, internet governance, and internet diffusion in developing countries primarily dates from her time at the Kennedy School. More recent work on Internet Governance addresses the full allocation of the v4 space.

Currently she has three major projects. The first is risk communication using mental models in order to inform security;  the second is measuring and communicating risk using a formal mission framework; and the third is security of SDN. Her recently completed projects address macroeconomic indicators of ecrime; and privacy perception in considering both true and perceived risks.

Camp is the author of Trust and Risk in Internet Commerce, Economics of Medical and Financial Identity Theft and the editor of Economics of Information Security. She coined the term anonymous atomic transactions by resolving the conflict between anonymity and Atomicity (database systems). Camp is also the Indiana University Representation for the Institute for Information Infrastructure Protection.

Camp is a lead researcher in the ETHOS project - Ethical Technology in the Homes Of Seniors which focuses on designing security and privacy-aware technologies for elders.

Camp was an Institute of Electrical and Electronics Engineers IEEE Congressional Fellow in 2010, under the aegis of the American Association for the Advancement of Science Science and Technology Fellowship Program. She served as the Legislative Assistant in military, telecommunications, and intellectual property in North Carolina's 2nd congressional district.

Camp is a Senior Member of the IEEE, on the US Association for Computing Machinery Council, long-standing member of the IEEEUSA, and was one of the Internet engineers who were early objectors to SOPA. She was named a 2021 ACM Fellow "for contributions to computer security and e-crime measures".

Bibliography 
 Trust and Risk in Internet Commerce
 Economics of Identity Theft
 editor, Economics of Information Security

References

External links
 
 School of Informatics and Computing
 Belfer Center
 Economics of Information Security

Harvard Kennedy School faculty
Indiana University faculty
Computer security academics
Living people
Sandia National Laboratories people
Year of birth missing (living people)
Fellows of the Association for Computing Machinery